Dandeli is a taluk in Uttara Kannada district of Karnataka, India, in the Malenadu region.

Description

Old Dandeli
As per the 1930 year, the population of Dandeli was only 515 and predominantly worked in the forestry department and government sawmill. Most residents belonged to the Konkanis, Devali, Marathas, Kuruba, Lambani, African, and Muslim communities. The settlement was located on the bank of the Kali river and developed into an industrial town with the establishment of a number of companies, including The Indian Plywood Manufacturing Company, Lalbhai Ferro-manganese Factory, West Coast Paper Mill, Indian Saw Mill, and a number of small industries around the Dandeli and Karnataka Power Corporation which were engaged in the construction of several power-generating dams at different places along the Kali river. The place was later called Old-Dandeli.

There was no school in the small town until in 1936, when Shivaji Narvekar, Pundalik Pai, Sadanand Gopal Nadkarni, Balappa Chavan and Bapshet together contributed to build a one-room school in a hut on the nearby hill where now the government Urdu school is situated. Ramachandra Ganapat Nayak migrated from Sanikatta near Gokarn to run the school. The school started with merely 18 students, three of whom were older than their teacher, R.G. Nayak. In 1939 the school was recognised by the British government.

Name 
A local legend states that the city is named after Dandelappa, a local deity, a servant of the Mirashi landlords, who died because of his loyalty. An alternative legend states that a king named Dandakanayaka passed through the forests and named them after himself, and the city is believed to stand on the place where Dandakaranya stood when he named the area.

Geography and climate 
Dandeli is located at 15.247719N, 74.629678W.

Wildlife sanctuary 

Dandeli is a natural habitat for wildlife, including tigers, leopards, black panthers, elephants, gaur, deer, antelopes, and bears. It is the second largest wildlife sanctuary in Karnataka and was designated as a tiger reserve in 2007. The jungle is also home to several varieties of reptiles and almost 300 varieties of birds. The rapid expansion of industry has raised fears of ecological damage to the area, and local volunteer groups have formed to address the issue.

Demographics 
As of the 2001 India census, Dandeli had a population of 53,287. Males constitute 51% of the population and females 49%. Dandeli has an average literacy rate of 74%, higher than the national average of 65%: male literacy is 81% and female literacy is 68%. In Dandeli, 11% of the population is under six years of age. Kannada is the widely spoken language in the region.
Dandeli's population was higher in the past, but lack of employment has forced people to migrate elsewhere. Jobs pay poorly, and traditional businesses have been disappearing for lack of customers. The West Coast Paper Mills is one of the largest employers in the town and the primary landowner; the mill has its own quarters, shopping complex, theatre, restaurant, playground, and a clubhouse for the employees. The company was promoted by Shree Digvijay Cement Company Limited, Sikka, Gujarat State in 1955. This company is also the main contributor to unpleasant odor affecting an otherwise very pleasant city.

Schools in Dandeli 
 St Michaels Convent School (Primary and High School)
 Rotary School (Primary and High School)
 Janata Vidyalaya (Primary and High school both Kannada and English medium)
 DFA School
 Anglo Urdu High School (Muslim Education Society Dandeli)
 Government School
 Kanya Vidyalaya
 Tauheed Education Society
 Bangur Nagar Hindi Higher Secondary School (Dandeli Education Society Hindi School)
 BLDE Education Society
 Govt. School Bilpar Dandeli (Primary and High school)
 Bangur Nagar Kannada Higher Primary School
 Adarsh Vidyalaya School (Ambewadi)
 Government Primary School (Ambewadi)
 Paridyan School

Pre-university colleges 
 Bangur Nagar Pre-University Composite Junior College
 Janata Vidyalaya
 Tauheed Education Society
 Government College Old Dandeli
 Kanya Vidyalaya Pre-university College Dandeli
 K.L.E. Society's Institute of Nursing Sciences, Dandeli

Degree colleges 
 DES Bangaur Nagar Degree College
 Govt Degree College
 Govt Degree College (Old Dandeli)

Other institutions 
 Sarvatomukh Vikas Kendra Dandeli (RI)
 S.V.K.'s Andakarimth Udyog Margadarshi Kendra Dandeli
 Kali Seva Pratistan Ganesh Nagar Dandeli
 Govt. Tool Room & Training Centre: Ambewadi Industrial Estate
 Asha Kiran Rural Private Industrial Training Institute, Ambewadi, under the aegis of Karwar Diocesan Development Council, Bishop's House, Karwar
 S.U.C. Polytechnic Dandeli
 VTU- National Academy for Skill Development Dandeli

News and media 
 Lokadhwani,  Deccan Herald, Prajavani, Vijaya Vani, Karavali Munjavu, Kannada Janantarang, Sayukta Karnataka, Tarun Bharat, the Times of India and Vijay Karnataka, and Dandeli Nakshatra (Stopped News Paper) are the major local newspapers in the region.

Tourism

Stay in Dandeli 
Dandeli resorts have become an attraction for wealthier, mobile residents from India and elsewhere. The biodiversity in the forest has attracted sufficient tourism to support a number of resorts in the vicinity of Dandeli. The government has promoted eco-tourism with proper planning of the healthy breeding of wild animals.

The natural environment of the area attracts tourists from other parts of India and abroad. It is an adventure sports destination, and a white-water rafting destination in South India. It is one of the few locations where rafting is possible even in peak summer months of March to June. Dandeli also offers many other adventure activities like Kayaking, Zorbing, Jungle safari, Cannoeing, River crossing etc.

Temples and Matha 
 Dandelappa Temple (Haliyal Road)
 Shree Ishwar Temple (Old Dandeli)
 Shree Veerabhadreshwar Temple (JN Road)
 Shiva Mandir (Kogilban Road))
 Mrutyunjay Math (Bank of River Kali)
 Datta Mandir (Kogilban Road)
 Shree Nagadevata Mandir (Ambewadi)
 Shree Ram Mandir (WCPM Area)
 Shree Balamuri Ganesh Mandir (Ganesh Gudi Road)
 Shree Raghavendra Swami Math (Town ship)
 Shankaracharya Math (Town ship)
 Venkataramana Temple (Kogilban Road)
 Jagadamba Temple – Savji's (Maruti Nagar)
 Hanuman temple (JN Road)
 Sai Baba Temple (Basveshwar Nagar, Ambewadi)
 Shree Durga Devi Temple (Near Government Hospital, JN Road)

Landmarks
Dandeli is surrounded by natural, historic, and religious landmarks: the River Kali, the caves of Kavala, the Syntheri Rocks, the Ulavi temple, and Sykes point. Karnataka Power Corporation residential colony is situated in Ambikanagar. ( from Dandeli). Nagajhari powerhouse is also nearby Ambikanagar where electricity is generated through hydropower. Also, other hydroelectric projects of KPCL like Supa dam, Tattihalla dam, Bommanahalla dam are located surrounding Dandeli town.

Other attractions
The sanctuary provides rafting opportunities at the Virnoli Rapids connected to the Kali River. Other tourist activities include nature walks, boating, bird watching, crocodile spotting and angling. Nearby tourist spots include Ulavi, Syntheri Rocks, Anashi National Park, and Moulangi.

See also 

 Karwar
 Mangalore
 Sirsi

References

External links 

Cities and towns in Uttara Kannada district
Populated places in the Western Ghats
Tourism in Karnataka